Robert Johnson (born 1953) is a retired South Carolina Department of Corrections Captain and United States Air Force veteran. He was a guard at the Lee Correctional Institution in South Carolina, where he oversaw efforts to stop contraband cellphones and drugs.

Air Force service
He joined the Air Force as a military policeman and retired after 20 years as a master sergeant. He was stationed at Nellis Air Force Base, Shaw Air Force Base, Ellsworth Air Force Base and Myrtle Beach Air Force Base.

Lee Correctional Institution incident
On the morning of March 5, 2010, Johnson was the victim of a hit orchestrated by criminals within Lee Correctional Institution. That morning, a gunman broke into Johnson's home and shot him six times with a .38 caliber revolver in the stomach and chest before leaving him for dead. Johnson's wife, Mary, was home but uninjured. 

Johnson was targeted by prisoners at the facility as retaliation for stopping contraband items such as drugs and cell phones from entering the prison. Following the shooting, Johnson began advocating for cell phone blocking technology in prisons around the country. In 2014, Sean Echols was charged for his role in the attempted murder.

Advocacy
In 2017, Johnson testified before the Federal Communications Commission prior to their vote approving the streamlining of processes required use technology to block and detect contraband phones in prisons.

References

External links
Radio Program featuring Robert Johnson

1953 births
Living people
American military police officers
American prison officers
People from South Carolina
United States Air Force non-commissioned officers